Quakers Hill Destroyers Rugby League Football Club is an Australian rugby league football club based in Quakers Hill, New South Wales formed in 1995.

Notable players 
Keith Eshman (2006 West Tigers)
Manaia Cherrington (2015-16 West Tigers)
 Oliver Clark (2019-20 West Tigers)

See also

List of rugby league clubs in Australia
Rugby league in New South Wales

References

External links
Quakers Hill RLFC Fox Sports pulse

Rugby league teams in Sydney
Rugby clubs established in 1995
1995 establishments in Australia